The heliotrope is an instrument that uses a mirror to reflect sunlight over great distances to mark the positions of participants in a land survey. The heliotrope was invented in 1821 by the German mathematician Carl Friedrich Gauss. The word "heliotrope" is taken from the Greek: helios, meaning "sun", and tropos, meaning "turn".

Colonel Sir George Everest introduced the use of heliotropes into the Great Trigonometric Survey in India around 1831, and the US Coast and Geographic Survey used heliotropes to survey the United States. The Indian specification for heliotropes was updated in 1981, and the American military specification for heliotropes (MIL-H-20194E) was retired on 8 December 1995.

Surveyors used the heliotrope as a specialized form of survey target; it was employed during large triangulation surveys where, because of the great distance between stations (usually twenty miles or more), a regular target would be indistinct or invisible. Heliotropes were often used as survey targets at ranges of over 100 miles. In California, in 1878, a heliotrope on Mount Saint Helena was surveyed by B.A. Colonna of the USCGS from Mount Shasta, a distance of 192 miles (309 km).

The heliotrope was limited to use on sunny days and was further limited (in regions of high temperatures) to mornings and afternoons when atmospheric aberration least affected the instrument-man's line of sight.  The heliotrope operator was called a "heliotroper" or "flasher" and would sometimes employ a second mirror for communicating with the instrument station through heliography, a signalling system using impulsed reflecting surfaces. The inventor of the heliograph, a similar instrument specialized for signaling, was inspired by observing the use of heliotropes in the survey of India.

See also 
 Heliograph, a similar instrument, used in communication

References

Further reading 
 Silvio A. Bedini (2004): The Surveyor's Heliotrope : Its Rise and Demise. www.TheAmericanSurveyor.com

External links 

 The Surveyor's Heliotrope
     Topographic, Trigonometric and Geodetic Surveying, by Herbert Michael Wilson (1912)  pp. 566–574 are devoted to heliotropes
 Elemente der Vermessungskunde, (in German) by Karl Maximilian von Bauernfeind (1862)  pp. 115–122 are devoted to Gauss's heliotrope, and the Stierlin and Steinheil heliotropes are described as well.
 The Heliotrope A short history.
   Transits of Venus Page with photographs of three heliotropes from 1873.
 Improvised Heliotrope  this 1969 article also provides the US Army part number for a heliotrope.
 Heliotrope Heliotrope photo, description of a 192-mile record.

Surveying instruments
Carl Friedrich Gauss